RWR can refer to:

Organizations

 Right Wing Resistance, a neo-Nazi group founded by Kyle Chapman (New Zealand activist)
 Russian War Relief, an American medical and humanitarian aid organization (1941–1945)

People 

 Ronald Wilson Reagan, 40th president of the United States
 Richard W. Roberts, a former U.S. District Court judge

Places and objects 

 The Royal Winnipeg Rifles, a Canadian infantry regiment

Sports 

 Race Walking Record, a monthly athletics magazine
 Rusty Wallace Racing, a NASCAR Nationwide Series race team, owned by NASCAR Cup Series champion Rusty Wallace
 Rick Ware Racing, a motor racing team owned by former NASCAR driver Rick Ware

Technology and electronics 

 Running with Rifles, a game created by Modulaatio Games
 Radar warning receiver, an equipment used to detect radio emissions of radar system

Other uses 
 Marwari language (ISO 639-3 language code for Marwari (India))